Laran Bronze is a fine art foundry in Chester, Pennsylvania. Founded in 1984 by Larry and Randy Welker in facilities built for the city's once-booming shipbuilding industry, the foundry has cast many monumental and significant sculptures, including many of the bronze components of the World War II Memorial in Washington, D.C. In 1985 or 1986, the foundry cast replicas of the hands of painter Andrew Wyeth; in 2019, one of these replicas sold at auction, along with a Wyeth painting, for $490,230.

The components cast at Laran for the WWII Memorial include four 18-foot columns, eight eagles with 10- to 12-foot wingspans, two 10-foot wreaths, and 24 plaques.

Other works cast at Laran Bronze include:

Holodomor Memorial, Washington, D.C.
Keys to Community, Philadelphia, Pennsylvania
Gregor Mendel, Villanova University, Philadelphia, Pennsylvania
The U.S. Air Force Honor Guard Memorial, Arlington, Virginia
Brigadier-General John Gibbon statue, Gettysburg battlefield, Gettysburg, Pennsylvania
 Sculptures on the Square, Charlotte, North Carolina
 Gem of the Lakes, 311 S. Wacker Drive, Chicago, Illinois

Works

External links

Notes

Foundries in the United States